The Ministry of Agriculture and Fisheries may refer to one of several national organisations:

 Danish Ministry of Food, Agriculture and Fisheries, formerly the Ministry of Agriculture and Fishing
 Ministry of Agriculture (France)
 Ministry of Fisheries and Agriculture (Iceland)
 Ministry of Agriculture and Fisheries (Jamaica)
 Ministry of Agriculture, Forestry and Fisheries (Japan)
 Ministry of Agriculture, Nature and Food Quality (Netherlands)
 Ministry for Primary Industries (New Zealand), formed in 2011 by the merger of the Ministry of Agriculture and Forestry and the Ministry of Fisheries
 Department of Agriculture, Forestry and Fisheries (South Africa)
 Ministry of Agriculture and Fisheries (United Kingdom), later the Ministry of Agriculture, Fisheries and Food

See also
Ministry of Agriculture